Baugur  is the informal name of one of three volcanic craters which have appeared as of 7 September 2014 - according to the Icelandic Meteorological Office website - in the Holuhraun lava field in Iceland as a result of an eruption in August 2014.

References 

Fissure vents
Volcanoes of Iceland
Active volcanoes